Karwar railway station is one of the main railway station in Uttara Kannada, Karnataka. Its code is KAWR. It serves Karwar city. The station consists of two platforms. A  railway bridge on Kali River falls before Karwar Railway Station while travelling from the side of Goa. The town of Karwar is situated beside Kali River.

Karwar is connected by Konkan Railway which connects Delhi, Bengaluru, Mumbai, Ajmer, Jaipur, Mysuru, Rajkot, Ernakulam, Indore, Bhopal, Thiruvananthapuram, Coimbatore, Jaipur, Ratlam, Madurai,. Hubli -Ankola railway line is proposed to link Karwar Port and the northern Karnataka as well as Honnavar -Talaguppa railway line.

However, the Save Konkan Ecology Forum (SKEF) is strictly & violently opposing Hubli–Ankola railway line & Honnavar–Talaguppa railway line projects, citing concerns regarding destruction & disruption of ecology, environment, forest, animals, flora & fauna of Ankola Forest & Talguppa Forest regions.

References

Railway stations in Uttara Kannada district
Karwar railway division
Railway stations along Konkan Railway line